Football was introduced to the Ottoman Empire by English men living in the area. The first matches took place in Selanik, now known as Thessaloniki, in 1875. F.C. Smyrna was the first football club established in Turkey. The same men brought football from İzmir to Istanbul in 1895. The first competitive matches between İzmir and Istanbul clubs took place in 1897, 1898, 1899, and 1904. The İzmir team won every match.

List of Turkish Sports Clubs by Foundation Dates

References

History of football in Turkey